is a passenger railway station located in the town of Ina, Saitama, Japan, operated by the Saitama New Urban Transit Company.

Lines 

Station layout
This elevated station consists of one island platform serving two tracks, on the west side of the Jōetsu Shinkansen tracks.

Platforms

History
The station opened on 22 December 1983.

Passenger statistics
In fiscal 2017, the station was used by an average of 4,030 passengers daily (boarding passengers only).

Surrounding area
Nihon Pharmaceutical University

See also
List of railway stations in Japan

References

External links

 Station information 

Railway stations in Saitama Prefecture
Railway stations in Japan opened in 1983
Ina, Saitama